Sir John Shaw (c. 1617 – 1690) was an English politician who sat in the House of Commons  between 1659 and 1679.

Shaw was the son of John Shaw of Colchester and his wife Mary Lufkin. His father was an alderman who supported the Royalist cause in the English Civil War.

In 1659, Shaw was elected Member of Parliament for Colchester in the  Third Protectorate Parliament. He was re-elected MP for Colchester for the Convention Parliament in 1660 and for the Cavalier Parliament in 1661 and sat until 1679.

In 1660 Shaw became Recorder of Colchester when his father was restored to his rank as alderman. He was knighted at Whitehall on 24 September 1661
 
Shaw married Thamar Lewes in 1643 and had several children.

References

 

1617 births
1690 deaths
Year of birth uncertain
Cavaliers
People from Colchester
English MPs 1661–1679
English MPs 1660
English MPs 1659